Miss Utah Teen USA competition is the pageant that selects the representative for the state of Utah in the Miss Teen USA pageant. From 2001 to 2007, the pageant was produced by Red Curtain Productions. Casting Crowns Productions directed the pageant from 2007 to 2018 under the directorship of former Miss Missouri USA Britt Boyse. Smoak Productions became the new director for Miss and Teen pageants in 2019 under executive director and Miss USA 1995 Shanna Moakler.

Utah is one of the least successful states at Miss Teen USA, having only placed five times. The first placement came in 1995, when Loni Sorden placed 2nd runner-up to Keylee Sue Sanders of Kansas. Utah was the fourth-to-last state (equal) to place at Miss Teen USA. Utah's second placement was in 2009, with Tasha Smedley making the top 15. The third placement was the following year, when Angelia Layton placed 3rd runner-up. In 2012, Keilara McCormick finished in the top 16, in 2017 Rachel Bell placed in the top 15, and in 2018 Madilen Kellogg placed top 10.

Four Utah teens have won the Miss Utah USA title and competed at Miss USA. The most recent of these is Marin Poole, Miss Utah Teen USA 2002 and Miss Utah USA 2005, who is also part of Red Curtain Productions. All three Miss Utah Teen USA winners who won the Miss Utah Teen USA titles went on to place at Miss USA like the Miss North Carolina USA titleholders.

Maizy Abbott of Pleasant View was crowned Miss Utah Teen USA 2022 on May 28, 2022 at Capitol Theatre in Salt Lake City. She will represent Utah for the title of Miss Teen USA 2022.

Results summary

Placements
2nd runners-up: Loni Sorden (1995)
3rd runners-up: Angelia Layton (2010)
4th runners-up: Ayzjiahna Wood (2021)
Top 10: Madilen Kellogg (2018)
Top 15: Tasha Smedley (2009), Rachel Bell (2017) 
Top 16: Keilara McCormick (2012)
Utah holds a record of 7 placements at Miss Teen USA.

Awards
Best State Costume: Ayzjiahna Wood (2021)

Winners 

1 Age at the time of the Miss Teen USA pageant

References

External links
Official website

Utah
Women in Utah